|}

The Leopardstown E.B.F. Mares Hurdle is a Grade 3 National Hunt hurdle race in Ireland which is open to mares aged four years or older. It is run at Leopardstown over a distance of 2 miles and four furlongs (4,023 metres) and during its running there are 10 flights of hurdles to be jumped. The race is scheduled to take place each year during the Christmas Festival at the end of December.

The race was first run in 2005, and was awarded Grade 3 status in 2011.

Records
Most successful horse (2 wins):
 Grangeclare Lark – 2006, 2007
 Our Girl Salley - 2010, 2011
 Let's Dance- 2016, 2017

Leading jockey (5 wins):
 Paul Townend – 	Voler La Vedette (2009), Let's Dance (2017), Stormy Ireland (2019), Concertista (2020), Shewearsitwell (2022)

Leading trainer  (7 wins):
 Willie Mullins -  Zuzka (2012), Let's Dance (2016, 2017),Good Thyne Tara (2018), Stormy Ireland (2019), Concertista (2020), Shewearsitwell (2022)

Winners

See also
 Horse racing in Ireland
 List of Irish National Hunt races

References
Racing Post:

National Hunt races in Ireland
National Hunt hurdle races
Leopardstown Racecourse
Recurring sporting events established in 2003
2003 establishments in Ireland